Acizzia acaciaebaileyanae is a psyllid common on Acacia baileyana, a popular garden specimen. They have also been associated with Acacia podalyriifolia. The psyllid and its host plant are native to Australia, but both are now widespread where the plant has been introduced including New Zealand, South Africa, Italy, and California, USA. The psyllid can reproduce to very high numbers, but appears not to damage the plant.

Gallery

References 

Psyllidae
Hemiptera of Australia
Insects described in 1901